Zarrin Dasht Rural District is a rural district (dehestan) in the Central District of Darreh Shahr County, Ilam Province, Iran. At the 2006 census, its population was 9,680, in 1,926 families.  The rural district has 24 villages.

References 

Rural Districts of Ilam Province
Darreh Shahr County